Arctostaphylos osoensis is a species of manzanita known by the common name Oso manzanita. It is endemic to San Luis Obispo County, California, where it is known from only two occurrences on the northern edge of the Los Osos Valley.

Description 
This is a spreading shrub reaching at least a meter in height and known to grow over four meters tall. The bark is grayish in color and shreddy. The foliage is dense with shiny, pointed, smooth-edged or toothed green to reddish leaves each up to 3 centimeters long.

The inflorescence is a loose bunch of urn-shaped manzanita flowers each about 6 millimeters long. The fruit is a hairless drupe between 0.5 and one centimeter wide containing several rounded seeds.

References

External links
Jepson Manual Treatment — Arctostaphylos osoensis
USDA Plants Profile: Arctostaphylos osoensis
Arctostaphylos osoensis — Photo gallery

osoensis
Endemic flora of California
Natural history of the California chaparral and woodlands
Natural history of San Luis Obispo County, California
•
Plants described in 1992